Judd Edward Stone II is an American lawyer who has been the Solicitor General of Texas since February 1, 2021.

Biography
Stone grew up in Collin County and Bexar County, Texas. He received his undergraduate degree from the University of Texas at Dallas and his Juris Doctor degree from Northwestern University School of Law. He served as a clerk to Justice Antonin Scalia on the United States Supreme Court, to Edith Jones on the United States Court of Appeals for the Fifth Circuit, and to Justice Daniel Winfree on the Alaska Supreme Court. He later practiced in the Supreme Court and Appellate Practice Group at Morgan, Lewis & Bockius, as well as at Kellogg, Hansen, Todd, Figel & Frederick, before becoming Chief Counsel to Senator Ted Cruz.

In 2020, Stone began working in the office of the Texas Solicitor General. After Texas Solicitor General Kyle D. Hawkins announced his intent to resign in January 2021, Texas Attorney General Ken Paxton appointed Stone to replace him. Stone became Texas Solicitor General upon Hawkins' resignation on February 1, 2021.

References

External links
Federalist Society Profile

Living people
Northwestern University Pritzker School of Law alumni
Solicitors General of Texas
University of Texas at Dallas alumni
21st-century American lawyers
People from Collin County, Texas
People from Bexar County, Texas
Year of birth missing (living people)